Tone Twister is the eleventh album led by jazz pianist and mathematician Rob Schneiderman, and the first in nearly a decade. Tone Twister was recorded on June, 2015, and released on the Hollistic MusicWorks label on September 28, 2017.

Reception 

In his review on DownBeat, Jeff Potter stated "Throughout his sideman stints with notables such as James Moody, J. J. Johnson,  Art Farmer  and  Eddie Harris,   his   tenure   in   the   band   TanaReid and his 10 previous discs as a  leader,  pianist  Rob Schneiderman  has   shown   a   straightahead   heart   marked by lyricism and no-nonsense taste."

Track listing 
All compositions by Rob Schneiderman except where noted
 Footloose Freestyle - 7:52
 Unforgettable (Irving Gordon) - 6:54
 Left Coast Lullaby - 6:33
 Distant Memory - 5:14
 Slapdance-Tapstick - 7:30
 Windblown - 5:44
 Tone Twister - 4:25
 Tailspin - 7:07
 The Lion's Tale - 8:36
 Unforgettable/Distant Memory (Bonus Track) - 11:20 
 Windblown Tailspin (Bonus Track) - 09:50

Credits 
 Bass – Gerald L. Cannon
 Drums – Pete Van Nostrand
 Engineer – Tyler McDiarmid
 Mastered By – Katsuhiko Naito
 Piano, Arranged By, Liner Notes – Rob Schneiderman
 Tenor Saxophone – Ralph Moore (2)
 Trumpet, Mixed By – Brian Lynch
 Written-By – Rob Schneiderman (tracks: 1, 3 to 9)

References 

Rob Schneiderman albums
2017 albums